Ohkawase Dam  is a gravity dam located in Hyogo Prefecture in Japan. The dam is used for irrigation and water supply. The catchment area of the dam is 279.6 km2. The dam impounds about 67  ha of land when full and can store 9300 thousand cubic meters of water. The construction of the dam was started on 1968 and completed in 1991.

See also
List of dams in Japan

References

Dams in Hyogo Prefecture